Sparrow is a given name and a surname derived from the common name of the bird.

Notable people with the surname include:

 Aaron Sparrow (born 1972), American football player
 Adolphus Sparrow (1869–1936), English cricketer
 Alexey Vorobyov (born 1988), also known as Alex Sparrow, Russian pop singer and musician
 Allan Sparrow (1944–2008), Canadian political activist
 Bobbie Sparrow (born 1935), former Canadian politician
 Brian Sparrow (1962–2019), English association footballer
 Charles Sparrow (1808–1897), fifth mayor of Bytown, Quebec
 Donald H. Sparrow (1935–1993), former Canadian politician
 Don Sparrow, Canadian illustrator
 Edward Sparrow (1810–1882), Confederate States of America politician
 Emory Sparrow (1897–1965), Canadian ice hockey player
 Ephraim M. Sparrow (1928–2019), American professor of engineering
 Frank Sparrow (1927–2000), Australian rules footballer
 George Sparrow (1869–1933), Australian rules footballer
 Gerald Sparrow (1903–1988), British lawyer, judge and travel writer
 Guy Sparrow (disambiguation), multiple people
 Henry Sparrow (1889–1973), English footballer
 Herbert O. Sparrow (1930–2012), Canadian politician
 Jeff Sparrow (born 1969), Australian writer
 Jill Sparrow (born 1971), Australian activist
 John Hanbury Angus Sparrow (1906–1992), English academic and barrister
 Matt Sparrow (born 1981), English footballer
 Mighty Sparrow (born Slinger Francisco 1935), West Indian calypso singer
 Pater Sparrow (born 1978), Hungarian filmmaker
 Paul Sparrow (born 1975), English association footballer
 Rajinder Singh Sparrow (1911–1994) a decorated Indian Army officer
 Rory Sparrow (born 1958), retired American basketball player
 Thomas J. Sparrow (1805–1870), American architect
 Walter Sparrow (1927–2000), British film and television actor
 Walter Shaw Sparrow (1862–1940), British writer on art and architecture

See also
 Jack Sparrow, fictional character in the Pirates of the Caribbean film series

English-language surnames
Given names derived from birds
Surnames from nicknames